Dąb Katowice was a Polish sports club from Upper Silesian capital of Katowice. Founded in 1911 as SV Eiche (Sport Verein Eiche) (Katowice was then located in German Empire, its German name was Kattowitz), the club existed until September 9, 1968, when a merger with GKS Katowice took place and a new organization took over the name GKS.

Dąb had numerous sports sections, including swimming (multiple champions of Poland in the years 1935–1939), boxing, gymnastics, ice-hockey (champion of Poland 1939), wrestling and soccer. Dąb's soccer team played two seasons in Polish League – in 1936 it was 8th, but in 1937 it was expelled from the League in mid-season, due to an attempt to bribe rivals. All Dąb's games’ results were changed to 0–3 and subsequently the team was relegated. Katowice's side most famous player is Ewald Dytko, who took part in the legendary 1938 World Cup Soccer game Poland – Brazil 5–6 (June 5, 1938, Strasbourg, France).

Football clubs in Katowice
Defunct football clubs in Poland
Association football clubs established in 1911
Association football clubs disestablished in 1937
Sport in Katowice
1911 establishments in Poland